Grown Ups is a 2010 American comedy film directed by Dennis Dugan, written by Adam Sandler and Fred Wolf, and produced by Sandler and Jack Giarraputo. The film stars Sandler, Kevin James, Chris Rock, David Spade, Rob Schneider, Salma Hayek, Maria Bello, and Maya Rudolph. The film tells a story of five lifelong friends who won their junior high school basketball championship in 1978. They reunite three decades later for a 4th of July weekend after learning about the sudden death of their basketball coach.

Produced by Sandler's Happy Madison Productions in association with Relativity Media, Grown Ups was released in the United States on June 25, 2010, by Columbia Pictures. Despite receiving unfavorable reviews from critics, it grossed $271 million and led to a sequel, Grown Ups 2, in 2013.

Plot 

In 1978, childhood friends Lenny Feder, Eric Lamonsoff, Kurt McKenzie, Marcus Higgins, and Rob Hilliard win their junior high basketball championship. They celebrate at a lake house with their coach Robert "Buzzer" Ferdinando.

Thirty years later in 2008, Lenny is a wealthy and successful Hollywood talent agent, married to fashion designer Roxanne and has three children named Greg, Keith, and Becky. Eric claims to co-own a lawn furniture company and has two children named Donna and Bean; his wife Sally still breastfeeds Bean. Kurt is a stay-at-home father, and has two children named Andre and Charlotte, his wife Deanne is pregnant with their third child, and her mother Ronzoni lives with them. Marcus is a slacker and lothario. Rob is married to his much older fourth wife Gloria.

When Buzzer dies, the five friends reunite for his funeral in their hometown with their families. Lenny rents the Earnshaw family's lake house for everyone to stay over Fourth of July weekend, though his family is leaving early to attend Roxanne's fashion show in Milan. He pushes Greg and Keith to play outside and runs into his childhood opponent Dickie, who claims Lenny's foot was out of bounds when he made the winning shot.

As the friends spread Buzzer's ashes, Rob breaks down over his failed marriages and reveals that he has invited his estranged daughters Jasmine, Amber, and Bridget to visit. The men play “arrow roulette”, shooting an arrow straight into the air, and Rob wins by not running for cover, but the arrow impales his left foot, causing him to 'snap' at Gloria from the pain. Lenny is thrilled to find the kids playing with cup-and-string telephones. Roxanne realizes the positive impact the weekend is having on their children and tells Lenny to cancel their Milan trip and stay at the lake instead.

Everyone visits Water Wizz where Marcus flirts with Jasmine and Amber after buying them skimpy bikinis, and Eric teaches Bean to drink cow's milk. The families cause chaos throughout the park: the wives attract a bodybuilder, then jeer at his high-pitched Canadian accent; Rob assaults a slide attendant when he insults Bridget, and Eric ignores Donna's warning about a chemical in the children's pool that turns urine blue. At the zipline attraction, Lenny's group meets up with Dickie, accompanied by his former teammates. One of them, Wiley, is severely injured after crashing into a shed while sliding down the zipline on his feet.

The next day, Rob attacks Marcus, mistakenly believing that he slept with Jasmine, and Marcus admits to feeling insecure compared to his happily married friends. Everyone comes clean about the state of their lives: Roxanne confronts Lenny for canceling their flight to Milan before they left home, and he admits that he wanted their family to have a normal vacation and to rein in Greg and Kieth's toxic attitudes; Deanne confronts Kurt for spending time with the Feders' nanny Rita, but Kurt retaliates by pointing out how she under-appreciates him; Eric reveals that he was laid off from his job, and was showing off the whole time so the others wouldn't humiliate him; Rob admits what everybody already knows – that he wears a toupee. Gloria helps everyone reconcile, and Lenny and Kurt offer to help Eric start a new business.

On their last day at the lake house, Lenny and his friends agree to a rematch against Dickie, Robideaux, Muzby, Tardio, and Malcolm. The game culminates in Lenny and Greg facing Dickie and his son, but Lenny misses the game-deciding shot. As the families watch the Fourth of July fireworks, Lenny tells Roxanne that he let Dickie's family win to get him off his case, and felt that his own family needed to know what losing feels like. A drunken Marcus plays another game of arrow roulette, and the crowd flees in panic. Trapped in a full-body cast, Wiley is struck in the foot by the arrow.

Cast

Production 

Sandler, Rock, Schneider, and Spade met when they all joined the cast of Saturday Night Live in the 1990–1991 season; supporting cast members Colin Quinn, Rudolph, Tim Meadows, and Norm Macdonald have also been SNL cast members.

Filming commenced in Essex County, Massachusetts, in August 2009. Chebacco Lake was used to portray the fictional Amoskeag Lake where the Earnshaw family's lake house setting was. Woodman's of Essex was used for the restaurant "Woodman's Eat in the Rough. Water Wizz was also used for the water park scene.

Release

Box office 
Grown Ups grossed $162 million in the United States and $109.4 million in other territories for a worldwide gross of $271.4 million against a production budget of $80 million. Grown Ups surpassed Click to become Sandler's highest-grossing film worldwide. Happy with the gross, Adam Sandler showed his appreciation by buying brand-new Maserati sports cars for his four co-stars.

Critical response 
On Rotten Tomatoes, Grown Ups has an approval rating of 11% based on 169 reviews and an average rating of 3.5/10. The site's critical consensus reads, "Grown Ups cast of comedy vets is amiable, but they're let down by flat direction and the scattershot, lowbrow humor of a stunted script." On Metacritic, the film has a score of 30 out of 100 based on 32 reviews, indicating "generally unfavorable reviews". Audiences polled by CinemaScore gave the film an average grade of "B" on an A+ to F scale.

Connie Ogle of the Miami Herald referred to it as "the perfect poster child for this maddening summer of movie mediocrity." Rick Groen of The Globe and Mail criticized what he saw as blatant commercialism, saying the cast "lob[bed] gags they surely disdain at an audience they probably despise while reserving their own laughter for that off-camera dash all the way to the bank." Richard Roeper went as far as to say that it was "a blight upon the bright canvas of American cinema", and that he hated it. Tom Long of the Detroit News called it "trite comedy" and "total garbage." On the other end of the spectrum, Lisa Kennedy of the Denver Post called it "crude and decent-hearted" and "easy, breezy, predictable."

Awards 
 
Rob Schneider was nominated for a Razzie Award for Worst Supporting Actor for the film, but lost to Jackson Rathbone for both The Last Airbender and The Twilight Saga: Eclipse.

The film won at the 2011 MTV Movie Awards for the "Best Line from a Movie" category, which it won for the line "I want to get chocolate wasted!", delivered by Becky, played by Alexys Nycole Sanchez.

Home media 
Grown Ups was released on DVD and Blu-ray Disc on November 9, 2010.

Sequel 

A sequel, titled Grown Ups 2, was released on July 12, 2013. Dennis Dugan, the director of the first film, returned as director. The main cast, including Adam Sandler, Kevin James, Chris Rock, David Spade, Salma Hayek, Maya Rudolph, Maria Bello and Steve Buscemi reprised their roles, except Rob Schneider. New cast includes Andy Samberg, Taylor Lautner and Patrick Schwarzenegger. The sequel follows Lenny Feder as he relocates his family back to the small town where he and his friends grew up.  Like its predecessor, Grown Ups 2 received very poor reviews but was still a box office hit.

References

External links 

 
 
 
 
 

2010 films
2010s buddy comedy films
American buddy comedy films
Columbia Pictures films
2010s English-language films
Films about vacationing
Films directed by Dennis Dugan
Films produced by Adam Sandler
Films produced by Jack Giarraputo
Films shot in Massachusetts
Films set in water parks
Films set in 1978
Films set in 2008
Happy Madison Productions films
Midlife crisis films
Relativity Media films
Films with screenplays by Adam Sandler
Films with screenplays by Fred Wolf
Films scored by Rupert Gregson-Williams
2010 comedy films
2010s American films